{|

{{Infobox ship career
|Hide header=
|Ship country=United States
|Ship flag=
|Ship name=* William H. Carruth
 Camel|Ship namesake=* William Herbert Carruth
 The camel 
|Ship owner=
|Ship operator=
|Ship registry=
|Ship route=
|Ship ordered=
|Ship awarded=
|Ship builder=
|Ship original cost=
|Ship yard number=
|Ship way number=
|Ship laid down=
|Ship launched=31 October 1943
|Ship sponsor=
|Ship christened=
|Ship completed=
|Ship acquired=22 November 1943
|Ship commissioned=22 November 1943
|Ship recommissioned=
|Ship decommissioned=22 May 1946
|Ship maiden voyage=
|Ship in service=
|Ship out of service=
|Ship renamed=
|Ship reclassified=
|Ship refit=
|Ship struck=
|Ship reinstated=
|Ship homeport=
|Ship identification=
|Ship motto=
|Ship nickname=
|Ship honours=
|Ship honors=
|Ship captured=
|Ship fate=Returned to the Maritime Commission 24 May 1946. Scrapped in 1963 at Tacoma Washington
|Ship notes=
|Ship badge=
}}

|}

USS Camel (IX-133), an Armadillo-class tanker, was the second ship of the United States Navy to be named for the camel, a ruminant found in Asia and Africa.  She was launched 31 October 1943 as William H. Carruth by California Shipbuilding Corporation, in Wilmington, California, under a Maritime Commission contract sponsored by Mrs. J. Low, was acquired by the Navy 22 November 1943, and commissioned the same day.Camel sailed from San Pedro, California, on 1 January 1944, for Tarawa, where she arrived 24 January to deliver aviation gasoline for use in the aerial reconnaissance missions then flown from that island.  From February through August, Camel operated on shuttle service, supplying fleet units and shore installations throughout the Marshall Islands and Mariana Islands with petroleum products. At Saipan, while discharging, Camel discovered two Japanese stowaways, both of whom jumped overboard. One was killed. The survivor told of his hope to reach Hawaii or the United States.Camel continued to supply the forces on Saipan and Guam from Eniwetok until 27 March 1945, when she cleared Ulithi for the Ryukyu Islands. After serving as station tanker at Kerama Retto from 2 April to 8 July, she sailed to Okinawa as headquarters ship for Service Division 104. During this period, her guns aided in driving off the massive effort of the Japanese to halt the operation by air attacks, and on 6 April she took part in splashing one enemy aircraft.

The tanker returned to the East Coast after occupation duty, was decommissioned at Norfolk, Virginia, 22 May 1946, and was returned to the Maritime Commission 24 May 1946.Camel'' received one battle star for World War II service.

References

External links
 Photo gallery at Navsource.org

Liberty ships
Ships built in Los Angeles
Armadillo-class tankers
1943 ships